Załuski  is a village in Płońsk County, Masovian Voivodeship, in east-central Poland. It is the seat of the gmina (administrative district) called Gmina Załuski.

References

Villages in Płońsk County